The 1986 Atlanta AT&T Challenge of Champions was a tennis tournament held in 1986. Boris Becker won in the final 3–6, 6–3, 7–5 against John McEnroe.

Players

Draw

Finals

Group A

Group B

References

1986 in sports in Georgia (U.S. state)
1986 in American sports
Tennis tournaments in Georgia (U.S. state)